Michele Castoro (14 January 1952 – 5 May 2018) was an Italian Roman Catholic archbishop.
Castoro was born in Italy and was ordained to the priesthood in 1975. He served as bishop of the Roman Catholic Diocese of Oria from 2000 to 2009. He then served as archbishop of the Roman Catholic Archdiocese of Manfredonia-Vieste-S. Giovanni Rotondo, Italy, from 2009 until his death.

Notes

1952 births
2018 deaths
Italian Roman Catholic archbishops
Deaths from cancer in Apulia
Pontifical Lateran University alumni
Pontifical Gregorian University alumni
Bishops appointed by Pope Benedict XVI
People from Altamura